Coleophora curta is a moth of the family Coleophoridae.

The larvae feed on Suaeda altissima, Suaeda paradoxa and Suaeda confusa. They feed on the generative organs of their host plant.

References

curta
Moths described in 1989